

Pre-war architecture refers to buildings built in the period between the turn of the 20th century until the Second World War, particularly in and around New York City. Many mid- and high-rise apartment buildings which were built between 1900 and 1939 in New York and surrounding areas are considered "pre-war" and known for their spaciousness, hardwood flooring, detailing, and, in some cases, fireplaces. Quite often they are luxury rentals or co-op apartments.

Examples
620 Park Avenue
655 Park Avenue
740 Park Avenue
834 Fifth Avenue
The Beresford

See also
Antebellum architecture

References 

American architectural styles
House styles
20th-century architecture in the United States